Butihinda is a town located in northern Burundi.  It is the capital city of Commune of Butihinda in Muyinga Province in north-eastern Burundi.

References

Populated places in Burundi
Muyinga Province